Banning, Delaware, USA was a stop in Cedar Creek Hundred on the now defunct Queen Anne's Railroad line between Ellendale and Greenwood positioned at the NE corner of what now is Road 44/Blacksmith Shop Road and Delaware Route 16/Beach Highway. After the railroad closed down and the tracks were removed, all Banning, Delaware property owned by the railroad was returned to Mark L. Banning, its previous landowner. A small town built around the Banning, Delaware stop disappeared.

References

Rail transportation in Delaware
Former populated places in Delaware
Former populated places in Sussex County, Delaware
Ghost towns in Delaware